Soraya Paladin (born 4 May 1993) is an Italian professional racing cyclist, who currently rides for UCI Women's WorldTeam . She rode in the 2014 Tour de Bretagne Féminin. Her sister Asja Paladin also competed professionally as a cyclist. She competed at the 2020 Summer Olympics, in Road race.

Major results

2016
 3rd Overall Giro del Trentino Alto Adige - Südtirol
 National Road Championships
5th Road race
8th Time trial
 6th Overall Giro della Toscana
 7th Overall Tour de Pologne
 9th Overall Trophée d'Or Féminin
2017
 3rd Road race, National Road Championships
 3rd Gran Premio della Liberazione
 5th Giro del Trentino Alto Adige-Südtirol
2018
 1st  Overall Giro della Toscana
1st Stage 2
 4th Le Samyn
 6th Grand Prix de Dottignies
2019
 1st  Overall Giro delle Marche in Rosa
1st  Mountains classification
1st  Sprints classification
1st Stage 3
 1st  Mountains classification, Tour of Norway
 2nd Overall Vuelta a Burgos
1st  Points classification
1st Stages 2 & 3
 2nd Overall Setmana Ciclista Valenciana
1st  Mountains classification
 3rd Overall Emakumeen Euskal Bira
 3rd Overall Tour de Yorkshire
 3rd Emakumeen Saria
 4th Liège–Bastogne–Liège
 5th Amstel Gold Race
 6th Giro dell'Emilia
 8th La Course by Le Tour de France
 9th Trofeo Alfredo Binda
 9th Overall Giro Rosa
 9th Crescent Vårgårda TTT
 10th Emakumeen Nafarroako Klasikoa
2020
 6th Giro dell'Emilia
 9th La Course by Le Tour de France
2021
 5th Trofeo Alfredo Binda
 5th Amstel Gold Race
 7th La Course by Le Tour de France
2022
 1st  Points classification, Tour de Romandie
 3rd Trofeo Alfredo Binda

See also
 Top Girls Fassa Bortolo
 Alé Cipollini

References

External links
 

1993 births
Living people
Italian female cyclists
Sportspeople from Treviso
Olympic cyclists of Italy
Cyclists at the 2020 Summer Olympics
Cyclists from the Province of Treviso